Elaenia is the debut studio album by British electronic musician Sam Shepherd, released under his alias Floating Points on 6 November 2015 by Shepherd's own Pluto label and Luaka Bop. Shepherd created the artwork for the album by connecting fibre-optic cables to a home made harmonograph. Shepherd had originally conceived the album to contain only one track but was advised against the idea and eventually cut the music into seven songs. Elaenia title track was named when Shepherd experienced a dream about a bird that became engulfed in a forest after he had been reading the speculative fiction novel Sum: Forty Tales from the Afterlives by American neuroscientist David Eagleman.

Reception

At Metacritic, which assigns a normalised rating out of 100 to reviews from mainstream critics, Elaenia received an average score of 85, based on 20 reviews, indicating "universal acclaim". It was rated as the best album of 2015 by Resident Advisor and was placed at number 20 on Pitchfork Medias list of albums of the year. XLR8R magazine rated it as the second best release of 2015.

Writing for Pitchfork, Philip Sherburne called Elaenia "rich and welcoming", saying that it was "as warm and fluid an 'electronic' album as you will hear all year". Sherburne praised the album's "timeless feel" and awarded it a "Best New Music" accolade. Sam Walker-Smart of Clash magazine said that it was "a sweeping, majestic debut...that pleases hearts and minds alike" and stated that it was "one of those rare albums that crosses genres and audiences with ease." Walker-Smart concluded his review by saying that "if you've any sense, you'll find a place in your library for this album". AllMusic reviewer Andy Kellman said that some listeners might feel a sense of anticlimax at the "slight" nature of the music in comparison to Shepherd's earlier work, saying that it was "fated to become one of those albums that inspires ritualistic listening parties held by small groups of audiophiles" but noted that "that shouldn't be held against it." Rolling Stones Ashley Zlatopolsky said that it was "a set that reflects the cutting-edge mechanisms of Shepherd's complex mind" that "confirm[s] him as one of contemporary electronic music's most forward-thinking talents." In his review for PopMatters, Nathan Stevens said that Elaenia was "not without its flaws" and stated that he found the album's length "disappointing", but said that it contained "some delicious food for the brain and ears."

Stephen Worthy of Mojo said that it was an "extraordinarily beautiful debut", calling it "a visionary synthesis of everyone from Debussy to Bill Evans, Talk Talk to Theo Parrish", while Exclaim!s Daniel Sylvester called it "a fascinating and confident debut". David Sackllah of Consequence of Sound said that Elaenia "stands out as a remarkably assured debut album" which will "likely confound and impress fans who have been following his output for the past half-decade." Sackllah said that the album was "a confident and fulfilling electronic record meant to be enjoyed in quieter spaces" but found that occasionally the middle section of the album felt too restrained. In his review for The Line of Best Fit, Rory Foster noted that the album was "something that has been worth waiting for" and said that it was "as impressive and rewarding as you want to be." DIY reviewer Danny Wright called the album "mesmerising", saying that it was "clever and warm, sophisticated and joyous." Mixmags Joseph Twin praised the precision of Shepherd's music and stated that Elaenia "demands focus [...] but pay attention to it and you'll be rewarded." Writing for Resident Advisor, Christine Kakaire said that "it was unlikely the first Floating Points album would've been anything other than beautiful, though its stunning virtuosity turned out more elusive than expected ... despite the record's wall-to-wall gorgeousness, Elaenia can feel tantalisingly out of reach."

Accolades 
The album landed on many year-end Best of 2015 lists by various publishers.

Track listing

References

External links
 

Luaka Bop albums
2015 debut albums
Floating Points albums